= Toshiba 902T =

Mobile phone model

The Toshiba 902T was a 3G cellphone made by Toshiba in 2005, and was sold under Vodafone Japan (now SoftBank Mobile). It's a variant of worldwide version TS921, that featured a 1.92-megapixel camera, a QVGA screen, a Bluetooth device, and "Active Turn Style" two-rotation axes display design.
