= Toshiba TS921 =

Toshiba mobile phone

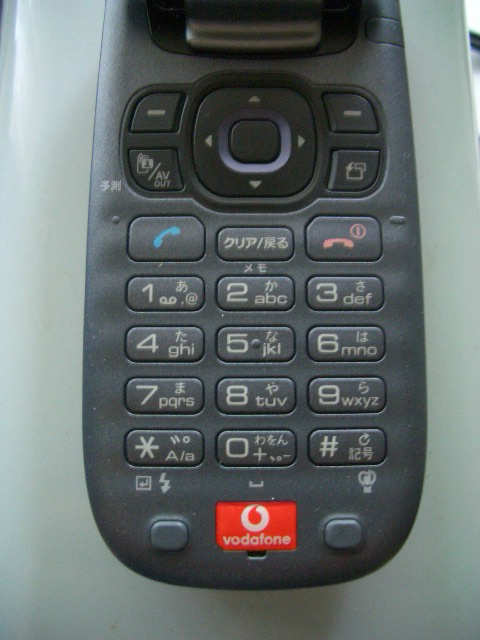
Japanese mobile phone keypad (Model Vodafone V902T)

The Toshiba TS921 (Vodafone 902T in Japan) is a Vodafone 3G model mobile phone manufactured by Toshiba. It comes in red, silver and black colours. It is on sale in Japan and a few other countries through Vodafone. It features a web browser which can read normal web pages, two cameras, one with a maximum resolution of 1200 X 1600 pixels. It can swivel the screen through 180 degrees and folded, and hence used identically to a camera. It uses the 3G network and thus can be used both inside and outside Japan. It connects to a computer USB via a standard Vodafone cable.
